The 2021–22 Seton Hall Pirates women's basketball team represented Seton Hall University during the 2021–22 NCAA Division I women's basketball season. The Pirates, led by ninth year head coach Anthony Bozzella, played their home games in South Orange, New Jersey at the Walsh Gymnasium as members of the Big East Conference.

The Pirates finished in the middle of the Big East with a 12–8 record and lost to Villanova in the semifinals of the conference tournament. In postseason, Seton Hall was invited to the 2022 Women's National Invitation Tournament where they won five straight games to appear in the final.

Previous season 
The 2020–21 Pirates finished the season 14–7, 12–5 in Big East play to finish third place in the conference. They lost in the first round of the Big East women's tournament to Creighton.

Roster

Schedule

|-
!colspan=9 style=| Exhibition

|-
!colspan=9 style=| Regular season

|-
!colspan=9 style=| Big East Women's Tournament

|-
!colspan=9 style=| WNIT

|-

See also
 2021–22 Seton Hall Pirates men's basketball team

References

Seton Hall
Seton Hall Pirates women's basketball seasons
2021 in sports in New Jersey
2022 in sports in New Jersey
Seton Hall